Heather Grace Angel (9 February 1909 – 13 December 1986) was a British actress. She was known for providing the voice of Mrs. Darling, Wendy's mother in Peter Pan (1953) and Alice's sister in Alice in Wonderland (1951).

Early life
Angel was born 9 February 1909 in Headington, Oxford, England. She was the daughter of Mary Letitia Stock and Andrea Angel, an Oxford University chemistry lecturer and initially a don at Brasenose College and later at Christ Church. They were married in 1904 and, after the wedding, they moved to the Banbury Road. Andrea Angel's maternal grandfather was an Italian refugee and he was named after his uncle Andrea Rabagliati.

In the 1911 UK Census, the family is shown as living at 17 Banbury Road, Oxford along with three servants. She was the younger of two sisters.

Andrea Angel was killed in the Silvertown explosion in January 1917, and posthumously awarded the Edward Medal (First Class). In his will, he left his wife £374 and shortly thereafter, his wife moved to London with the two daughters. By 1929, when Heather was 19, she was already appearing with an overseas touring theatre company managed by Charles Bradbury-Ingles. The same record shows that she was living at 20 Queen Anne's Grove, London W4, when she left.

Career

Stage
Angel began her stage career at the Old Vic in 1926 and later appeared with touring companies. Her Broadway debut came in December 1937 in Love of Women at the Golden Theatre. She also appeared in The Wookey (1941–42).

Film

Angel appeared in many British films. She made her first screen appearance in City of Song. She later had a leading role in Night in Montmartre (1931), and followed this success with The Hound of the Baskervilles (1932). She then decided to move to Hollywood. She sailed on the Majestic to New York on 21 December 1932 with her mother. Over the next few years, she played strong roles in such films as The Mystery of Edwin Drood (1935), The Three Musketeers (1935), The Informer (1935) and The Last of the Mohicans (1936).

In 1937 she made the first of five appearances as Phyllis Clavering in the popular Bulldog Drummond series. She was cast as Kitty Bennett in Pride and Prejudice (1940) and as the maid, Ethel, in Suspicion (1941). Angel was also the leading lady in the first screen version of Raymond Chandler's The High Window, released in 1942 as Time to Kill. She was one of the passengers of Alfred Hitchcock's Lifeboat (1944). Her film appearances in the following years were few, but she returned to Hollywood to provide voices for the Walt Disney animated films Alice in Wonderland (1951) and Peter Pan (1953). From 1964 until 1965, she played a continuing role in the television soap opera Peyton Place. After that role, she played Miss Faversham, a nanny and female friend of Sebastian Cabot's character of Giles French in the situation comedy Family Affair.

Personal life
Angel married actor Ralph Forbes in Arizona in 1934, a union that lasted less than ten years. Angel had acted with Henry Wilcoxon in Self Made Lady (1932) when they were both in Britain. When she heard Wilcoxon was also in Hollywood, she contacted him. She invited him to polo matches at the home of Will Rogers and later taught him horseback riding. They acted together in two other films: The Last of the Mohicans (1936) and Lady Hamilton (1941). Though they remained lifelong friends, they never married. Heather and her husband were both present at the wedding of Wilcoxon to his first wife. They had intended to host the wedding at their house in Coldwater Canyon.

Angel married Robert B. Sinclair (1905–1970), a film and television director, in 1944. On 4 January 1970, an intruder, Billy McCoy Hunter, broke into their home. When Sinclair attempted to protect Angel, Hunter killed him in her presence, then fled. He was allegedly found with a knife and pistol when arrested. The incident is believed to have been a failed burglary. Angel had one son with Sinclair in 1947.

Death
In 1986, Angel died of cancer in Los Angeles. She was cremated at Santa Barbara Cemetery.

Recognition 
Angel has a motion pictures star on the Hollywood Walk of Fame for her contributions to the film industry. Her star is located at 6301 Hollywood Boulevard.

Filmography

References

Bibliography

External links

Photographs and literature

1909 births
1986 deaths
20th-century American actresses
20th-century English actresses
Actresses from Oxfordshire
Actors from Oxford
American stage actresses
American film actresses
American soap opera actresses
American television actresses
American voice actresses
British emigrants to the United States
Burials at Santa Barbara Cemetery
Deaths from cancer in California
English film actresses
English stage actresses
English voice actresses
English people of Italian descent